Hubley is a residential community within the Halifax Regional Municipality, Nova Scotia on Trunk 3 between Upper Tantallon and Timberlea approximately 15 kilometres from Halifax.

Communications 
 The first three digits of the postal code are B3Z
 The telephone exchange is 902 876
 Cable Internet access - Eastlink, DSL - Aliant

Statistics 
 Total population 1029
 Total dwellings 348
 Total land area: 57.4445 km2
 Many lakes in the area
 Hubley is primarily composed of three subdivisions: Lake of the Woods, Sheldrake Lake and Three Brooks. Lake of the Woods, Sheldrake Lake and Three Brooks are affluent communities. There are several parks in the area, as well as campgrounds and hiking trails.
 Other areas of Hubley include Birch Bear Woods and Five Island Lake Estates, which are smaller areas located near Three Brooks.
 The former Sir John A. Macdonald High School (1969) is located in Hubley. In 2006, a new high school was opened in Tantallon and the building in Hubley became Five Bridges Junior High School. 
 Hubley Pizza is the lone corner store.
 The BLT Trail runs through Hubley, primarily parallel to St Margaret's Bay Road.

Area Lakes
 Sheldrake Lake
 Upper Sheldrake Lake
 Fredrick Lake
 Big Hubley Lake

References 
 Explore HRM

Communities in Halifax, Nova Scotia